Mauser Model 1936 may refer to:
 Belgian Mauser Model 1889/36, a Mauser Model 1889 variant
 The Mexican Mauser Model 1936